This is a list of episodes from the twentieth season of Real Time with Bill Maher. Due to the COVID-19 pandemic, this is the first season of Real Time where the shows do not premiere live. Rather, they are pre-recorded at 7:00 pm ET with the 10:00 pm ET airing unchanged. Episodes this season are taped from the show's studio with a limited audience due to the pandemic, with all guests appearing in studio.

Episodes

References

External links
 
 HBO.com Episode List

Real Time with Bill Maher seasons
2022 American television seasons
Television series impacted by the COVID-19 pandemic